Jako is a German sportswear company.

Jako may also refer to:
 Jákó, a village in Hungary
 Jako Island, an island in East Timor
 Jennifer Jako, American activist and filmmaker
 Numata Jakō, 17th-century Japanese woman

See also 
 Jaako (disambiguation)
 Jaco (disambiguation)
 Jacko (disambiguation)